This article contains demographic features of the United Arab Emirates (UAE), including population density, vital statistics, immigration and emigration data, ethnicity, education levels, religions practiced, and languages spoken within the UAE.

Population  

The United Arab Emirates experienced a significant population increase in recent years as a result of major economic growth certain economic sectors. This led to an influx of workers from diverse cultural and religious backgrounds, increasing the population from 4.1 million in 2005 to roughly 9.5 million in 2018. As of 2018, the number of UAE citizens is around 11.5% and the remaining 88.5% made up of expatriate workers, one of the largest proportion of expats in relation to the nationals. The largest group of non-UAE nationals are South Asian 59.4% (includes Indians 38.2%, Bangladeshi 9.5%, Pakistani 9.4%, others 2.3%), Egyptian 10.2%, Filipino 6.1%, other 12.8%.

Female citizens and non-citizens account for 28% percent of the UAE's population due to the high level of male foreign workers.  The majority of the UAE population falls in the age group of 25 to 54 year old. A large part of this can be attributed to the expatriate population of working men and women who fall in the age category. Population is heavily concentrated to the northeast on the Musandam Peninsula, the three largest Emirates - Dubai (2.7 million), Abu Dhabi (1.9 million) and Sharjah (1.4 million), are home to nearly 75% of the population.

The population of the UAE in 2018 was 9,630,959, a 1.52% increase from 2017. In 2019, the population was 9,770,529, a 1.45% increase from 2018. The current population of the UAE stands at 9,991,089 million, a 1.02% increase from 2020.

According to sources, the 2021 UAE population including expats is 9.99 million, of which 69% of the population is male and 31% of the population is female. The total expat population in UAE has now come to 8.84 million, which constitutes approximately 89% of the population. Emiratis or the UAE nationals are only 11% or 1.15 million today. While taking a closer look at the 2021 UAE population by nationality, there are people from more than 200 nationalities living and working in the country. Currently, the Indian population in UAE is the highest with 2.75 million, followed by Pakistanis with 1.27 million. The UAE has around 0.75 million Bangladeshi nationals, 0.56 million Filipinos, and 0.48 million Iranians. There are also people from Egypt (0.42 million), Nepal (0.32 million), Sri Lanka (0.32 million), China (0.21 million) and the rest of the world (1.79 million).

Population pyramid data

Education and employment

The United Arab Emirates government have always focused on increasing the quality of education, allowing female access to higher education and value their achievements.  Currently, there are more women in higher education than men, with total graduates of 58 percent. However, the unemployment rate for women is about more than five times higher than men. The program that is the most popular is business with the highest number of graduates, and the second popular program is humanities and social science. The UAE relies on migrant workers, and they make up a majority of the population and will continue to increase and will be about 88.2 percent of the population in 2030.

Vital statistics

UN prospects

Source: United National World Population Prospects

Births and deaths

Life expectancy 

Source: UN World Population Prospects

Ethnicity of UAE immigrants 

The UAE National Bureau of Statistics does not publish demographic data in relation to any nationality. The figures listed in the table below are estimates provided by each country's embassy.

Source: United Arab Emirates Population Statistics

 *The figures for the countries cannot be directly sourced to embassy statements.

Ethnic groups

 Emirati nationals 11.6%
 Other Arab and Iranian nationalities ≈18%
 South Asian nationalities 59%
 Other expatriate nationalities (includes Westerners, East Asians and Africans) ≈12%

Languages

Although Arabic is the official language, the most used language is English. English is also the main medium of instruction at all levels of schooling.

Emirati people speak Gulf Arabic. The Achomi language (Persian dialect) is also spoken by a 303,000 people in the UAE.

Other languages spoken in the UAE, due to immigration, include other Arabic dialects (such as Levantine Arabic), Malayalam (1,060,000 speakers in the UAE), Urdu, Hindi, Marathi, Persian, Cebuano, Pashto (144,000 speakers in the UAE), Kannada, Bengali (337,000 speakers in the UAE), Punjabi (201,000 speakers in the UAE), Odia, Telugu, Baluchi and Southern Baluchi (379,000 speakers in the UAE), Sinhala (121,000 speakers in the UAE), Russian, Somali, Tagalog (303,000 speakers in the UAE), Nepali, Mandarin, Tamil (455,000 speakers in the UAE), Spanish, Italian and Greek.

In 2019, Abu Dhabi included Hindi as third official court language. Currently, the UAE government provides lectures and tests to obtain a driving license in Urdu, Hindi, Malayalam, Tamil and Bengali, besides Arabic and English.

Practiced religions

Religions are represented in the UAE as follows:
 Islam (official) 76%
 Christian 9%
 Other 15% (primarily Hindu and Buddhist, a small minority are Parsis, Baháʼí, Druze, Sikh, etc.)

See also
 Demographics of Dubai
 Emirati diaspora

References

 

pt:Emirados Árabes Unidos#Demografia